Alunogen (from French alun, “alum”), also called feather alum and hair salt is a colourless to white (although often coloured by impurities, such as iron substituting for aluminium) fibrous to needle-like aluminium sulfate mineral. It has the chemical formula Al2(SO4)3·17H2O.

It is often found on the walls of mines and quarries as a secondary mineral. It can be found in the oxidation zones of some ore deposits as well as on burning coal dumps (i.e., as the product of millosevichite hydration). It also forms as a low temperature deposit in fumaroles. It occurs associated with pyrite, marcasite, halotrichite, pickeringite, epsomite, potash alum, melanterite and gypsum.

The crystallochemical formula, can be written as: [Al(H2O)6]2(SO4)3.5H2O. The second formula shows that H2O in the alunogen formula occurs both as ligand (coordinative form) and loosely bound (crystallization) form.

References

Sulfate minerals
Aluminium minerals
Triclinic minerals
Minerals in space group 2